Jean-Baptiste Marcel Éloi Bonfils (21 April 1921 – 26 November 2007) was a 20th-century French organist, music educator, musicologist and composer.

Biography 
After the war, he resumed his studies at the conservatoire de Paris where he obtained a First Prize in organ (1949) in the class of Marcel Dupré, a 2nd Prize in composition (1948) in the class of Jean Rivier and a 1st medal in musical analysis (1950) with Olivier Messiaen.

In the same year, he became Olivier Messiaen's assistant on the organ of the église de la Trinité à Paris, and this until 1992, then the assistant of Naji Hakim until 1999. 
Jean Bonfils was also the organist at the Grand Synagogue of Paris from 1953 to 1997.

Bonfils taught the organ at the Schola Cantorum de Paris from 1961 to 1973.

With Gaston Litaize, he directed the important series L'Organiste liturgique (1953-1967) at Éditions musicales of the Schola Cantorum and la Procure générale de Musique.

Bonfils died in Rennes (Ille-et-Vilaine department) on 26 November 2007 at the age of 86.

Publications 
1969–1970: The first two Livres d'orgue by Jacques Boyvin at Éditions Ouvrières 
1963: The Second Livre d'orgue (1714) sur les Acclamations de la Paix tant désirée, including 18 noëls, by André Raison, at Éditions musicales de la Schola Cantorum et de la Procure Générale de musique
1964: The Livre d'orgue du Père Pingré : Anonymes français du XVIIIe siècle, Paris, musical editions of the Schola Cantorum
1969–1970: The first two Livres d'orgue by Jacques Boyvin at Éditions Ouvrières 
1974: A Livre d'orgue attributed to Jean-Nicolas Geoffroy at Heugel

In collaboration with Noëlie Pierront, Bonfils published:
 The series Deo gloria: répertoire liturgique de l'organiste pour orgue sans pédale ou harmonium in ten volumes.
 a Nouvelle méthode de clavier, orgue-positif, harmonium, in 4 issues (1960-1963)
 a Nouvelle méthode d'orgue, in 2 issues  (1962).

References

External links 
 Musica et Memoria Detailed biography by Denis Havard de la Montagne.

1921 births
2007 deaths
Musicians from Saint-Étienne
Conservatoire de Paris alumni
French classical organists
French male organists
Male classical composers
20th-century French musicologists
French music educators
20th-century organists
20th-century French male musicians
Male classical organists